Lepadiformes is an order of crustaceans belonging to the class Maxillopoda.

Families:
 Anelasmatidae Gruvel, 1905
 Heteralepadidae Nilsson-Cantell, 1921
 Koleolepadidae Hiro, 1933
 Lepadidae Darwin, 1852
 Malacolepadidae Hiro, 1937
 Microlepadidae Hoek, 1907
 Oxynaspididae
 Poecilasmatidae Annandale, 1909
 †Priscansermarinidae Newman, 2004 
 Rhizolepadidae Zevina, 1980

References

Maxillopoda
Crustacean orders